Henry Jackson Wells Dam (April 27, 1856 – April 26, 1906)  was a journalist and playwright. His story "The Red Mouse" was adapted for the film Her Silent Sacrifice. He wrote the words to the musical comedy The Shop Girl. He conducted the only interview ever given by Wilhelm Röntgen about his Röntgen rays (X-rays) in 1896. He also interviewed Guglielmo Marconi about his radio telegraph transmitter in 1897.

His work was published in McClure's Magazine, He was also a playwright. The Black Cat, and The Strand Magazine.

Dam traveled to London the cover the Jack the Ripper murders and has been discussed as a possible author of some of the Jack the Ripper letters.

He was born in San Francisco and moved to London where he married stage actress Dorothy Dorr (1866–1940). They had two children, Colby Dorr Dam and Losing Dam. The family returned to the U.S. in the early 20th century.

He died in of cancer in Havana, Cuba.

A heliograph image of him is at The American Vaudeville Museum Archive at the University of Arizona from his musical comedy The Shop Girl (1894).

Work

Plays
I want yer, ma honey : an Ethiopian oddity, with Fay Templeton
Carmelita (1883)
The Silver Shell, a play (1893)
The Shop Girl : musical farce, music by Ivan Caryll
The White Silk Dress, a play

Stories
"Monsieur Bibi's Boom-Boom", The Strand Magazine (1900)
"The Red Mouse"
"The Transmogrification of Dan" in The Smart Set magazine (1901)

Articles
"The New Marvel in Photography, A Visit to Professor Röntgen at his laboratory in Würzburg. His own account of his great discovery. Interesting experiments with the cathode rays. Practical uses of the new photography", Article in McClure's Magazine about William Konrad Rontgen's work on X-rays, New York (Vol. VI, Nr. 5, April 1896)
"The Terrible Vesuvis", Windsor Magazine (1898)
The Mystery of Vesuvius (1898)
"The New Telegraphy: An interview with Signor Marconi", The Strand Magazine, George Newnes, Ltd., London, Vol. 13, No. 75, March 1897
"The tax on moustaches" Strand Magazine, Newnes, London (1899)
The Making of the Bible
"Practical Penology", North American Review, May 1887, pages 514-523
"A Morning with Bret Harte", December 1894 McClure's Magazine

References

Journalists from California
American magazine writers
19th-century American journalists
1856 births
Writers from San Francisco
19th-century American male writers
American male journalists
American male dramatists and playwrights
19th-century American dramatists and playwrights
1906 deaths
20th-century American male writers
Deaths from cancer in Cuba
American expatriates in the United Kingdom
20th-century American writers